Harrisville Grade School, also known as Harrisville High School and Harrisville Public School, is a historic school building located at Harrisville, Ritchie County, West Virginia. It is a two-story brick structure on a cut stone foundation with a blend of Italianate and Greek Revival details. It was built in 1878, and expanded in 1904.  It remained in operation until 1965, then occupied by board of education offices.  In the 1990s, plans were made for it to become a museum.  It is open by the Ritchie County Historical Museum as the General Thomas M. Harris School Museum.

It was listed on the National Register of Historic Places in 1997.  It is located in the Harrisville Historic District.

References

External links
General Thomas M. Harris School Museum website

History museums in West Virginia
School buildings on the National Register of Historic Places in West Virginia
Italianate architecture in West Virginia
Greek Revival architecture in West Virginia
School buildings completed in 1878
Museums in Ritchie County, West Virginia
National Register of Historic Places in Ritchie County, West Virginia
School museums
Former school buildings in the United States
Historic district contributing properties in West Virginia
1878 establishments in West Virginia